Adrian Pelka (born 22 June 1981) is a German former professional footballer who played as a midfielder.

Career

RoPS
Receiving his license to take part in competitions with RoPS near the end of August 2005, Pelka was seen as one of their most important members after they hosted KuPS, operating at defensive midfielder. However, the middleman ostensibly let the opposition dispossess him and have a penalty in a 5–1 defeat by MyPa, leading to suspicion of match manipulation three years later especially since Malaysian William Bee Wah Lim  was discovered to have bet on a defeat by four-goals in favor of MyPa. At the time, the club officials did not suspect him but severely criticized him for the errors.

In total, he made two Veikkausliiga appearances during the 2005 season.

References

1981 births
Living people
German footballers
Association football midfielders
Regionalliga players
Veikkausliiga players
Rovaniemen Palloseura players
Hamburger SV II players
1. FC Pforzheim players
FC Nöttingen players
1. FC Heidenheim players
German expatriate footballers
German expatriate sportspeople in Finland
Expatriate footballers in Finland